Robert P. Wood (1892 – August 1928) was a Scottish professional footballer who played in the Scottish League for Falkirk as an inside left.

Personal life 
Wood served as a private in McCrae's Battalion of the Royal Scots during the First World War. He was wounded during the course of his service. Wood died in a mining accident at Glencraig Colliery in 1928.

Career statistics

Honours 
Falkirk

 Stirlingshire Cup: 1919–20
 Falkirk Infirmary Shield: 1914–15, 1919–20

References 

Scottish footballers
Royal Scots soldiers
Scottish Football League players
McCrae's Battalion
Place of birth missing
British Army personnel of World War I
Falkirk F.C. players
Association football inside forwards
1892 births
1928 deaths
Alloa Athletic F.C. players
Scottish miners